Madagascar is an island country located off the eastern coast of Africa.

Madagascar may also refer to:

Places
 Geography of Madagascar
 Madagascar Plate

Entertainment
 Madagascar (1994 film), a Cuban film by Fernando Pérez
 Madagascar (franchise), a film franchise by DreamWorks Animation
 Madagascar (2005 film), an American computer-animated comedy film produced by DreamWorks Animation
 Madagascar: Escape 2 Africa, the 2008 sequel to the 2005 film
 Madagascar 3: Europe's Most Wanted, the 2012 sequel to the 2008 film
 Penguins of Madagascar, the spin-off to the 2012 film
 Madagascar (soundtrack), a soundtrack to the 2005 film
 Madagascar (video game), a video game based on the 2005 film
 Madagascar: Escape 2 Africa (video game), a video game based on the film
 Madly Madagascar, a Valentine's Day special 
 Merry Madagascar, a Christmas special
 The Madagascar Penguins in a Christmas Caper, an animated short
 The Penguins of Madagascar, a television spin-off
 Madagascar (TV series), a 2011 documentary series narrated by David Attenborough
 "Madagascar" (song), a 2008 song by Guns N' Roses from their album Chinese Democracy
 "Madagascar", a song by Art of Trance

Ships
 List of ships named Madagascar
 HMS Madagascar, two vessels of the British Royal Navy

Other uses
 Madagascar (software), a software package for multidimensional data analysis

See also
 Madagascar national football team
 Madagascar national rugby union team
 Madagascar Davis Cup team
 Madagascar Fed Cup team
 Madagascar women's national basketball team
 Malagasy (disambiguation)